Raj N. Sippy (born 6 March 1948) also known as Raj Sippy, is an Indian film director and producer working on Bollywood films. He was very prominent in the 1980s, with successful films, like Inkaar, Satyamev Jayate and Mahaadev with Vinod Khanna, Satte Pe Satta with Amitabh Bachchan, then Boxer and Baazi with Mithun Chakraborty He directed  Satyamev Jayate, the come back film of Vinod Khanna after his Osho stint.

He has also directed Akshay Kumar's debut film Saugandh and Sanjay Dutt - Jeetendra starrer Thanedaar.

Sippy directed the unsuccessful Jimmy, Mimoh Chakraborty's launch pad. Consequently, his other film featuring Mimoh, Hamilton Palace, is still unreleased. Sippy has run into financing issues due to the financial failures of these two films.

Filmography
2011 Hamilton Palace
2008 Jimmy
2004 ...Woh
1998 Kudrat
1998 2001: Do Hazaar Ek
1997 Koi Kisise Kum Nahin
1997 Deyshat
1996 Laalchee
1995 Paandav
1995 Nishana
1994 Ikke Pe Ikka
1994 Amanaat
1993 Pardesi
1992 Mr. Bond
1991 Saugandh
1991 Qurbani Rang Layegi
1990 Thanedaar
1990 Kali Ganga
1989 Shehzaade
1989 Mahaadev
1987 Satyamev Jayate
1987 Loha
1986 Jeeva
1985 Sitamgar
1985 Shiva Ka Insaaf
1984 Andar Baahar
1984 Baazi
1984 Boxer
1983 Qayamat
1982 Satte Pe Satta
1981 Josh
1977 Inkaar

References

External links

1948 births
Living people
20th-century Indian film directors
Hindi-language film directors
Film directors from Mumbai
21st-century Indian film directors
Hindi film producers
Film producers from Mumbai